Kabile Parish is an administrative unit of Kuldīga Municipality in the Courland region of Latvia. The parish has a population of 870 (as of 1/07/2010) and covers an area of 178.98 km2.

Villages of Kabile parish 
 Galamuiža
 Jaunāmuiža
 Kabile
 Kalnansi
 Kāņmuiža
 Leiši
 Meķi
 Pusgaldiņi
 Vecāmuiža
 Višļi

Notable sights and places 
 Kabile Manor

Parishes of Latvia
Kuldīga Municipality
Courland